The Gochashvili were a Georgian noble family, a collateral branch of the royal Bagrationi dynasty of Kartli, which flourished from the sixteenth century to the eighteenth century. It is now extinct.

History
The family of Gochashvili were descended from Alexander, a younger son of Constantine II, the last king of a united Georgia and the first king of the independent kingdom of Kartli. The surname itself derives from Alexander's grandson Gocha, a notable military commander, who was killed in a battle with the Ottoman army at Gori in 1599.  In the middle of the seventeenth century, the family were in opposition to their reigning pro-Iranian cousins, and the two Gochashvili, Giorgi and Ioram, the father and the son, were blinded in 1638 and 1664, respectively. Ioram had even aspired to become king of Kartli and, relying on the support of the duke of Aragvi, had plotted the overthrow of Vakhtang V, king of Kartli and member of the house of Mukhrani, who, like the Gochashvili, were collaterals of the royal Bagrationi. Following these setbacks, the Gochashvili declined to become one of numerous princely (tavadi) families and became extinct with the death of Ioram's grandson Garsevan sometime after 1736.

Genealogy
Alexander (fl. 1530)
Gorgasal (fl. 1540)
Constantine (fl. 1540–1560), married a daughter of Khosro, grandson of Alexander II of Imereti
Melkisedek (fl. 1547–1560)
Giorgi (fl. 1547–1560) 
Gocha (d. 1599)
Giorgi (fl. 1638)
Ioram (fl. 1664)
Gorgasal (fl. 1716)
Garsevan (fl. 1736)

References

Noble families of Georgia (country)
G
Georgian-language surnames